Club Deportivo Ceuta 6 de Junio is a Spanish football club based in the autonomous city of Ceuta. Founded in 1969, they play in Regional Preferente, holding home matches at Estadio José Martínez Pirri with a capacity of 1,500 seats.

History
Founded in 1969, Ceuta 6 de Junio only started playing in a regional league in the 2020–21 season, in the Regional Preferente. After finishing second and missing out promotion to AD Ceuta FC B, the club won a spot in the 2021–22 Copa del Rey.

The club won the Preferente title in the 2021–22 campaign, but as Ceuta B were not promoted nor relegated, they were unable to promote, and once again earned a spot in the national cup.

Season to season

References

External links
BDFutbol team profile
Soccerway team profile

Football clubs in Ceuta